Henryk Bąk (2 January 1923 – 29 August 1987) was a Polish actor. He appeared in more than 50 films and television shows between 1952 and 1980.

Selected filmography
 Eroica (1958)
 Bad Luck (1960)
 Milczące ślady (1961)
 Kwiecień (1961)
 Zacne grzechy (1963)
 Barrier (1966)

References

External links

1923 births
1987 deaths
Polish male film actors
People from Krasnystaw
People from Lublin Voivodeship (1919–1939)
Polish male stage actors
Burials at Powązki Cemetery
Recipients of the Order of Polonia Restituta (1944–1989)